Strange World is a 2022 American computer-animated science-fiction adventure film produced by Walt Disney Animation Studios and distributed by Walt Disney Studios Motion Pictures. The 61st film produced by the studio, it was directed by Don Hall, co-directed by Qui Nguyen, and produced by Roy Conli, from a screenplay written by Nguyen, who also conceived the story with Hall. The film stars the voices of Jake Gyllenhaal, Dennis Quaid, Jaboukie Young-White, Gabrielle Union, and Lucy Liu. It is Disney's seventh animated film to tackle the sci-fi genre, after Big Hero 6 (2014). The film follows a legendary family of explorers, the Clades (Gyllenhaal, Quaid, Young-White, and Union), who must set aside their differences as they embark on a journey to a mysterious subterranean land inhabited by surreal lifeforms, in order to save a miracle plant Pando that is their society's source of energy.

Strange World draws inspiration from pulp magazines, Journey to the Center of the Earth (1864), Fantastic Voyage (1966), Jurassic Park (1993) and King Kong (1933). To communicate non-verbally, several animators worked to create the movement of the character Splat. While the film is predominately CGI, the film does incorporate 2D animation from Randy Haycock, with additional 2D animation by Eric Goldberg and Mark Henn in certain scenes.

Strange World premiered at the El Capitan Theatre in Los Angeles on November 15, 2022, and was theatrically released in the United States on November 23. The film was noted for introducing Walt Disney Animation Studios' first openly LGBTQ lead character. It received generally positive reviews from critics, who praised the animation, visuals, and voice acting, but criticized the screenplay. The film was a box-office bomb, with projections of as much as a $147 million loss for Disney; it also being the first box-office bomb for Walt Disney Animation Studios since 2007’s Meet the Robinsons. However, it was a streaming hit on Disney+, where it became the number one film being streamed for 19 days.

Plot
In Avalonia, a land surrounded by an endless wall of mountains, Jaeger Clade and his fifteen-year-old son Searcher are adventurers who brave the wilderness to explore new worlds. While trying to traverse the mountains, Searcher discovers a green plant that gives off energy. Searcher and the rest of the expedition team decide to return to Avalonia with the plant while Jaeger angrily continues his mission alone. Twenty-five years later, a now forty-year-old Searcher has made a name for himself by introducing the miracle plant, dubbed Pando, as a fuel source for Avalonia. He and his wife Meridian are Pando farmers, while their son, Ethan, has a crush on his friend Diazo and chafes at his father's expectation that he will become a farmer as well.

One night, Callisto Mal, the president of Avalonia and one of Jaeger's former expedition teammates, shows up in her airship, the Venture, and informs the Clades that Pando is losing its power; she asks Searcher to help find the cause. He joins an expedition to travel into a giant sinkhole, in which the roots of Pando have been located. Meridian chases after them in her crop-duster to find Ethan, who stows away on the Venture with their dog, Legend, but when the crop-duster is destroyed in an attack by red wyvern-like creatures, she joins the expedition as well. 

The Venture crash-lands in a subterranean world, and Searcher and Legend are separated from the group. They are attacked by a creature called a "Reaper", but are rescued by Jaeger, who has been living underground all these years. He has been trying to cross the mountains from below, but is blocked by an acidic ocean, and states his intention to board the Venture to attempt to cross it. Meanwhile, Ethan sneaks away from the Venture to find his father. He befriends an amorphous blue creature, naming it Splat, before being reunited with Searcher, Legend and Jaeger. They are attacked by more Reapers, but are rescued by Meridian and Callisto and return to the Venture.

Searcher insists on completing their mission, while Jaeger wants to continue journeying across the Strange World. Ethan becomes frustrated with them and their opposing worldviews. After another wild encounter, Searcher and Jaeger finally have a heart-to-heart talk and realize that they do respect each other's goals in life. Eventually they find a cluster of Pando's roots, which is being attacked by the Strange World's creatures.

When Searcher learns that Ethan wants to explore more of the Strange World, he blames Jaeger's influence on him. Frustrated with Searcher, Ethan jumps off the Venture and on to one of the Reapers. Searcher follows him aboard a small flying vehicle, but as they are reconciling, they realize that they have passed through the mountains to the ocean beyond, where they see the eye of a giant turtle-like creature. The two realize that Avalonia is on the creature's back, and that they have been traveling through its body, meaning that the Reapers and all the other creatures are its immune system. Seeing that Pando is an infection attacking the creature’s heart, they head back to inform the expedition team that Pando must be destroyed, but Callisto has them locked up to prevent them from stopping the mission, while Jaeger furiously sails off to see for himself. After Legend and Splat free the family, Searcher and Ethan head to the creature's heart to clear a path for the Reapers, while Meridian takes over the ship and convinces Callisto to help. Jaeger returns, and with his help, they break through Pando, and the creatures appear and destroy it, bringing the heart back to life and saving the land.

One year later, Ethan is in a relationship with Diazo as they and their friends collect resources from the Strange World; Avalonia has shifted from Pando energy to wind turbines; Jaeger revisits his ex-wife Penelope, who has remarried during his absence; and Searcher and Jaeger's relationship has improved.

Voice cast
 Jake Gyllenhaal as Searcher Clade, Jaeger's son, Meridian's husband, and Ethan's father who is a farmer of the Pando power source.
 Dennis Quaid as Jaeger Clade, Searcher's father and Ethan's grandfather who is more of a larger-than-life explorer.
 Jaboukie Young-White as Ethan Clade, Searcher's 16-year-old son who longs for adventure beyond his father's farm while also navigating a school crush. Being a gay character, Ethan is Walt Disney Animation Studios' first openly LGBTQ main character.
 Gabrielle Union as Meridian Clade, Ethan's mother, and Searcher's wife who is a pilot and natural leader.
 Lucy Liu as Callisto Mal, the president of Avalonia and leader of the exploration into the strange world who helps the Clades to lead the adventures.
 Karan Soni as Caspian, a nerdy member of the expedition to Strange World.
 Alan Tudyk as Duffle, a pilot for the expedition to Strange World who is killed by wyvern-like creatures. His role is a reference to Tudyk's Firefly character Hoban "Wash" Washburn.
 Tudyk also voices the Narrator at the beginning of the film and an announcer on the radio.
 Adelina Anthony as Captain Pulk, the second-in-command of the expedition to Strange World.
 Abraham Benrubi as Lonnie Redshirt, a member of Jaeger's expedition crew before he disappeared. His last name refers to the trend in Star Trek for those wearing red shirts to die insignificantly.
 Jonathan Melo as Diazo, Ethan's love-interest and boyfriend at the end.
 Nik Dodani as Kardez, one of Ethan's friends.
 Francesca Reale as Azimuth, one of Ethan's friends.

In the end credits, Legend, the Clades' three-legged dog who resembles an Old English Sheepdog, and Splat, the blue creature from the Strange World, are listed as playing themselves.

Production

Development
In December 2021, Walt Disney Animation Studios announced a new film titled Strange World with Don Hall as director, Qui Nguyen as co-director and writer, and Roy Conli as producer.

Casting
On June 6, 2022, following the release of the teaser trailer, Jake Gyllenhaal was announced as the voice of Searcher Clade. Eleven days later, the rest of the main cast for the film was announced at France's Annecy Animation Festival, including Jaboukie Young-White as Ethan Clade, Gabrielle Union as Meridian Clade, Lucy Liu as Callisto Mal, and Dennis Quaid as Jaeger Clade.

Animation, design and influences
According to Hall, Strange World is a nod to pulp magazines—popular fiction from the first half of the 20th century that was printed on inexpensive wood pulp paper, including films like Journey to the Center of the Earth, Fantastic Voyage and King Kong. He also said "[he] loved reading the old issues of pulps growing up. They were big adventures in which a group of explorers might discover a hidden world or ancient creatures. They've been a huge inspiration for Strange World."

The miracle plant Pando is named after a forest in Utah in America. For the worlds both beyond the land and below the giant creature, the land of Avalonia was given an orange-and-white color scheme to contrast with the titular strange world inside the creature, for which the filmmakers chose red and magenta for the lung forest. They created a way for the character Splat to communicate non-verbally, like the magic carpet in Aladdin. While the rest of the film is CGI, 2D animation was also added from Randy Haycock with additional 2D animation by Eric Goldberg and Mark Henn. An example of it would be from the opening scene of Strange World, showing Jaeger having 2D outlines from WDAS' Meander software, giving it a Spider-Verse-like style within the comic before going back to CGI.

Music 

Henry Jackman was announced to compose the score for the film, marking his third collaboration with Don Hall, after Winnie the Pooh and Big Hero 6, and his fifth overall feature-length scoring work with Walt Disney Animation Studios, which includes the Wreck-It Ralph films.. Walt Disney Records released the soundtrack on November 23, 2022, the same day as the theatrical release.

Release

Marketing

Following the project announcement, the first look concept art of the film was released on December 9, 2021. Max Evry of /Film said the image "[looked] a lot like Avatar, or at the very least the Pandora section of Disney World's Animal Kingdom." The teaser trailer was released on June 6, 2022. Petrana Radulovic for Polygon felt it was "an homage to retro sci-fi flicks" and similar to Raya and the Last Dragon, it "definitely seems to lean more into the action than Disney's typical musical fantasies." A new trailer was shown at the 2022 D23 Expo and the official trailer was released on September 21, 2022, followed by a cast reaction video a day later, and a "special look" trailer was released on October 19, 2022. Two featurettes "Welcome To Strange World" and "100 Years of Amazing Characters", which showcased the characters of Splat and Legend, were released on November 3, 2022, and November 8, 2022, respectively.

Theatrical
Strange World premiered at the El Capitan Theatre in Hollywood on November 15, 2022. It was theatrically released in the United States on November 23, 2022.

Strange World was not released theatrically in some regions; due to Disney's opposition to local regulations regarding theatrical windows, the company announced on June 8, 2022, that Strange World would not see a theatrical release in France and would instead go straight to Disney+ in the region following its theatrical release in other regions, and Deadline Hollywood reported that Disney pulled out for a theatrical release in 20 countries, mainly the Middle East, Africa, South Asia, Russia and China, due to the inclusion of a gay main character, Ethan Clade. This was done to prevent those regions' censorship of LGBTQ+ references, as a main storyline in the film revolves around Ethan having a crush on another boy.

This was the first film to feature the commemorative 100th anniversary Disney logo in celebration of the company's centennial in 2023, created by Disney Studios Content and Industrial Light & Magic, which was revealed at the 2022 D23 Expo. Christophe Beck composed a new arrangement of "When You Wish Upon a Star".

Streaming and home media
Strange World began streaming on Disney+ on December 23, 2022. 

According to Flix Patrol, Strange World was the most streamed film on Disney+ upon its release on the streaming service. According Whip Media's TV Time, Strange World was the 8th most streamed film across all platforms in the United States, during the week ending December 25, 2022, and the 6th during the week of December 30, 2022. Strange World was the 6th most popular film on Fandango’s transactional digital service Vudu, during the week ending January 1, 2023.

Walt Disney Studios Home Entertainment released Strange World on Ultra HD Blu-ray, Blu-ray, and DVD on February 14, 2023.

Reception

Box office 
Strange World grossed $38 million in the United States and Canada, and $35.6 million in other territories, for a worldwide total of $73.6 million. Following its poor opening weekend, Variety and Deadline Hollywood estimated the film would lose the studio $100–147 million.

In the United States and Canada, Strange World was released alongside Glass Onion: A Knives Out Mystery and Devotion, as well as the wide expansions of The Fabelmans and Bones and All, and was initially projected to gross $30–40 million from 4,174 theaters over its five-day opening weekend. The film made $4.2 million on its first day (including $800,000 from Tuesday night previews), which led to less optimism about it meeting initial box office projections and could debut to as low as $23 million. The film ended up debuting even lower than initial re-adjustments, making $11.9 million in its opening weekend (a five-day total of $18.6 million). Several publications labeled the film a box office bomb, with The Hollywood Reporter saying was "the worst opening for a Disney Animation Thanksgiving title in modern times" and Variety calling it a "catastrophic result for Disney". The poor opening was blamed on poor audience reception, middling critical reviews, a vague and unremarkable premise, and lackluster marketing compared to other Disney animated films.

Streaming 
Strange World was the most watched movie worldwide on Disney+ on the last week of 2022 and the first two weeks of 2023. It topped the Disney+ chart in almost every country where it was available.

Critical response 
  Audiences polled by CinemaScore gave the film an average grade of "B" on an A+ to F scale, while those at PostTrak gave it an overall positive score of 82%, including an average four out of five stars. Strange World was the first film from Walt Disney Animation to earn lower than "A–" and is considered the lowest CinemaScore rating of all Disney animated films since 1991.

Peter Debruge of Variety wrote "it's the characters as much as the environment that make this vibrant, Journey to the Center of the Earth-style adventure movie colorful and diverse in all the best ways. Great as the people and places they explore may be, however, the relatively unimaginative story consigns this gorgeous toon to second-tier status ... instead of cracking the pantheon of Disney classics." Lovia Gyarke of The Hollywood Reporter praised the visuals, writing it was "meticulously and wondrously rendered by the Strange World animators, who drew much of their inspiration from pulp magazines of the 30s and 40s. There's a painterly feel to the landscape, which, combined with the film's sci-fi bent, might trigger memories of Disney's Treasure Planet." Tracy Brown of the Los Angeles Times also praised the visuals as "vibrant, weird, visually stunning... From its lush palette to its cute and deadly flora and fauna, this strange, mysterious world is very much deserving of its status as the film's title character."

Richard Roeper of the Chicago Sun-Times wrote the film is not in the same category as "Frozen, Zootopia and Encanto, it's a family-friendly fun fest with the expected ingredients of fast-paced action, ingenious visuals, terrific voice performances and, yes, some heaping spoonfuls of upbeat messaging about family ties, the importance of being true to oneself and how we should all take great measures to take care of not only each other but the world in which we live, no matter how STRANGE that world might be." Brian Truitt of USA Today gave the film three stars out of four, stating Strange World is "an enjoyable piece of vibrant world building that steps away from the musical bent of recent non-Pixar efforts like Encanto and the Frozen flicks." Odie Henderson of The Boston Globe praised the film's environmental and father-son messages, as well as the "excellent voice-over work plus the score by Henry Jackman make the preachiness palatable and the film fun. The look of Avalonia's underworld is a lovely distraction; its garish and bright pinks, reds, and greens look lifted from the colored roofs of a suburban New Jersey neighborhood in the 1970s."

For The Washington Post, Kristen Page-Kirby found "the story is too basic and the characters too slight for Strange World to pack a punch. The visual beauty of the film isn't enough. After all, pretty is as pretty does — and in Strange World, pretty doesn't do much." Jacob Stoller of Paste Magazine admitted that while the film "can be arresting—especially with its inventive setting and bulbous creatures—and its attempts at deconstructing the sweaty, macho-man ethos hawked by its inspiration are admirable. But with muddled themes and slight characters, remnants of the old dime magazines coordinate to bring Strange World down on the wrong side of familiar." Cath Clarke of The Guardian felt the characters "aren't half-bad", but the "clunky script feels like it's been re-drafted and re-drafted to the point of incomprehension – blowing any chance of conveying a message. However well-meaning, it makes for a surprisingly dull watch."

Accolades

Notes

References

External links
 
 

2020s American films
2020s children's animated films
2020s English-language films
2020s monster movies
2022 3D films
2022 computer-animated films
2022 LGBT-related films
3D animated films
American 3D films
American children's animated action films
American children's animated adventure films
American children's animated comedy films
American children's animated science fantasy films
American computer-animated films
American LGBT-related films
American monster movies
American teen films
Animated films about extraterrestrial life
Censored films
Disney controversies
Films about farmers
Films about father–son relationships
Films directed by Don Hall
Films scored by Henry Jackman
Films set on farms
Films set on fictional planets
Gay-related films
LGBT-related animated films
LGBT-related controversies in animation
LGBT-related controversies in film
LGBT-related science fiction films
Walt Disney Animation Studios films
Walt Disney Pictures animated films